Shapatha is a 1984 Indian Kannada-language action film, directed by  Amrutham and produced by Ramnarayan. The film stars Shankar Nag, Nalini, Ashok and Vijayalakshmi Singh. The film was a remake of Tamil film Vengaiyin Maindhan which was released on 9 March 1984.

Cast

Shankar Nag
Nalini
Ashok
Vijayalakshmi Singh
Ambareesh
Srivani
Charan Raj
Master Nithin
Master Rajesh
Sudheer
Musuri Krishnamurthy
Srinivasa Murthy
Bangalore Nagesh
Jr. Narasimharaju
Lakshman
Sathyabhama

References

External links
 

1984 films
1980s Kannada-language films
Films scored by Shankar–Ganesh
Indian films about revenge
Kannada remakes of Tamil films